Thomas Deniaud (born 31 August 1971) is a French former professional footballer who played as a striker.

External links

1971 births
Living people
French footballers
Association football defenders
AJ Auxerre players
Angers SCO players
Le Havre AC players
Clermont Foot players
Ligue 1 players
Ligue 2 players
USJA Carquefou players
Moulins Yzeure Foot players
Footballers from Nantes
Brittany international footballers